Labradorite ((Ca, Na)(Al, Si)4O8) is a calcium-enriched feldspar mineral first identified in Labrador, Canada, which can display an iridescent effect (schiller).

Labradorite is an intermediate to calcic member of the plagioclase series. It has an anorthite percentage (%An) of between 50 and 70. The specific gravity ranges from 2.68 to 2.72. The streak is white, like most silicates. The refractive index ranges from 1.559 to 1.573 and twinning is common. As with all plagioclase members, the crystal system is triclinic, and three directions of cleavage are present, two of which are nearly at right angles and are more obvious, being of good to perfect quality (while the third direction is poor). It occurs as clear, white to gray, blocky to lath shaped grains in common mafic igneous rocks such as basalt and gabbro, as well as in anorthosites.

Occurrence 
The geological type area for labradorite is Paul's Island near the town of Nain in Labrador, Canada. It has also been reported in Poland, Norway, Finland and various other locations worldwide, with notable distribution in Madagascar, China, Australia, Slovakia and the United States.

Labradorite occurs in mafic igneous rocks and is the feldspar variety most common in basalt and gabbro. The uncommon anorthosite bodies are composed almost entirely of labradorite. It also is found in metamorphic amphibolites and as a detrital component of some sediments. Common mineral associates in igneous rocks include olivine, pyroxenes, amphiboles and magnetite.

Labradorescence

Labradorite can display an iridescent optical effect (or schiller) known as labradorescence. The term labradorescence was coined by Ove Balthasar Bøggild, who defined it (labradorization) as follows:

Contributions to the understanding of the origin and cause of the effect were made by Robert Strutt, 4th Baron Rayleigh (1923), and by Bøggild (1924).

The cause of this optical phenomenon is phase exsolution lamellar structure, occurring in the Bøggild miscibility gap.

The lamellar separation only occurs in plagioclases of a certain composition; those of calcic labradorite (50-70% anorthite) and bytownite (formula: , i.e., with an anorthite content of ~70 to 90%) particularly exemplify this. Another requirement for the lamellar separation is a very slow cooling of the rock containing the plagioclase. Slow cooling is required to allow the Ca, Na, Si, and Al ions to diffuse through the plagioclase and produce the lamellar separation. Therefore, not all labradorites exhibit labradorescence (they might not have the correct composition and/or they cooled too quickly), and not all plagioclases that exhibit labradorescence are labradorites (they may be bytownite).

Some gemstone varieties of labradorite exhibiting a high degree of labradorescence are called spectrolite.

Gallery

See also
 
 Aventurescence
 Lapis lazuli
 Larvikite
 Opal

References

External links 

 

Calcium minerals
Feldspar
Minerals in space group 2
Provincial symbols of Newfoundland and Labrador
Sodium minerals
Tectosilicates
Triclinic minerals